Stefan Kretzschmar (born 17 February 1973, in Leipzig) is a retired professional German handball player.  The son of Peter Kretzschmar, a legendary handball player and coach in the former GDR (East Germany) and Waltraud Kretzschmar, a former handball player for the East German team and winner of Olympic team medals in silver (1976) and bronze (1980), he was a three-time Olympic athlete and winner of the Olympic silver medal with the German team in 2004.  He is well known for his many tattoos and piercings.  He ended his active career on 14 July 2007 and currently resides in Magdeburg, Germany, where he continues to hold a position with the local handball club, SC Magdeburg. His daughter Lucie-Marie Kretzschmar is a professional handball player too and member of the german national team.

Honours 
Handballer of the year: 1994, 1995
Silver Medal (Runners-up), World Championships, 2003
International All Star-Team: 1994
DHB-Supercup: 2007
Handball European Cup: 2002
EHF Cup: 2007

See also 
Sportvereinigung (SV) Dynamo

References

 Website
 SC Magdeburg
 Time Magazine Profile

1973 births
Living people
German male handball players
Olympic handball players of Germany
Handball players at the 1996 Summer Olympics
Handball players at the 2000 Summer Olympics
Handball players at the 2004 Summer Olympics
Olympic silver medalists for Germany
Olympic medalists in handball
Sportspeople from Leipzig
Medalists at the 2004 Summer Olympics
SC Magdeburg players